Stara Pazova railway station is a railway station in Stara Pazova, Serbia. Railroad continued to Inđija in one, in the other direction to Nova Pazova and the third direction towards to Golubinci. Stara Pazova railway station consists of 6 railway track.

See also 
 Serbian Railways
 Beovoz

References 

Stara Pazova
Railway stations in Vojvodina